Astra Airlines was a Greek regional airline headquartered in Thessaloniki and based at Thessaloniki International Airport.

History
The carrier was founded by Ioannis Zlatanis, founder of Interaviator Ltd, and Anastasios Zirinis, former CEO of Olympic Aviation. It launched operations on 5 July 2008, flying from Thessaloniki to Rhodes.

On 9 November 2019, it was reported that Astra Airlines faced severe financial difficulties and was searching for an investor to maintain its current operations. The airline grounded all flights on the same day until further notice. On 14 November 2019, IATA announced that it had suspended the airline and warned Greek travel agents to stop selling tickets on the airline with immediate effect.

On 18 November 2019, it was reported that the airline would not resume operations for good.

Destinations

As of May 2016, Astra Airlines served the following destinations:

Greece
Athens – Athens International Airport - focus city
Chios – Chios Island National Airport
Corfu – Corfu International Airport
Heraklion – Heraklion International Airport
Ikaria – Ikaria Island National Airport
Kalamata – Kalamata International Airport
Karpathos – Karpathos Island National Airport - seasonal
Kastoria –Kastoria National Airport
Kithira – Kithira Island National Airport - seasonal
Kos – Kos Island International Airport
Kozani – Kozani National Airport
Lemnos – Lemnos International Airport
Milos – Milos Island National Airport - seasonal
Mykonos – Mykonos Island National Airport - seasonal
Mytilene – Mytilene International Airport
Samos – Samos International Airport
Santorini – Santorini (Thira) National Airport - seasonal
Sitia – Sitia Public Airport
Thessaloniki – Thessaloniki International Airport - hub
Zakynthos – Zakynthos International Airport - seasonal

Germany
Munich – Munich Airport - seasonal

Israel
Tel Aviv - Ben Gurion Airport - seasonal charter

Fleet

As of August 2019, the Astra Airlines fleet consisted of the following aircraft:

References

External links
Official website

Defunct airlines of Greece
Airlines established in 2008
Airlines disestablished in 2019
European Regions Airline Association
Companies based in Thessaloniki
2020 disestablishments in Greece
Greek brands
Greek companies established in 2008